Ladawan Mulasartsatorn (born 18 March 1970) is a Thai badminton player. She competed in women's doubles at the 1992 Summer Olympics in Barcelona.

References

External links

1970 births
Living people
Ladawan Mulasartsatorn
Ladawan Mulasartsatorn
Badminton players at the 1992 Summer Olympics
Badminton players at the 1986 Asian Games
Badminton players at the 1990 Asian Games
Ladawan Mulasartsatorn
Ladawan Mulasartsatorn
Ladawan Mulasartsatorn